Patran is a city in Patiala district in the Indian state of Punjab. It lies at a distance of around 60 Km from the city Patiala.

Demographics
 India census, Patran had a population of 38,125. Males constitute 20,091 of the population and females 18,034. Patran has an average literacy rate of 65%, higher than the national average of 59.5%: male literacy is 69%, and female literacy is 60%. In Patran, 13% of the population is under 6 years of age.

Patran is big marketplace for rice. This town has more than 100 Rice Shellers. This city is known for car palaces. Patran is well connected with Dirba, Tohana,Hisar, Kaithal, Delhi, Jind, Ludhiana, Jalandhar, Patiala and Sangrur by well maintained roads. So this city has good relations with these cities because of exporting of rice. This is developing city of Punjab with fertile land.

History 
During princely time, Patran was only a small village and was known for a big lake named ‘Bhupindra Sagar’ which had been got built by Maharaja bhupindra Singh of Patiala for hunting purpose near Patran
According to locals, Patran was also associated with the notorious Jagga Dacoit who used to rob the rich and help the poor. There was an ancient dera known as Mai Dera which is visited by a large number of people. It is still situated amidst natural surroundings of old trees. In this complex, there is also a tomb of Baba Sottewala and an ancient Shiva Temple.
According to the 1981 Census, the area of the town within the municipal limits was 3.00 km2. And its population was 7,998.
A notified area committee was constituted at Patran on 1 June 1970. The civic amenities provided by the committee include sanitation, water supply, street lighting, sewerage and cleanliness of the town and disposal of refuse.
According to the 1991 Census, its population was 14,328.

Schools 
 Mother India Public School, DAV Public School, Guru Teg Bahadur Public Senior Secondary School, Affiliated to CBSE Gurukul Global Creanza School

References

Cities and towns in Patiala district